An ESD simulator, also known as an ESD gun, is a handheld unit used to test the immunity of devices to electrostatic discharge (ESD). These simulators are used in special electromagnetic compatibility (EMC) laboratories. ESD pulses are fast, high-voltage pulses created when two objects with different electrical charges come into close proximity or contact. Recreating them in a test environment helps to verify that the device under test is immune to static electricity discharges.

ESD testing is necessary to receive a CE mark, and for most suppliers of components for motor vehicles as part of required electromagnetic compatibility testing.  It is often useful to automate these tests to eliminate the human factor.

There are three distinct test models for electrostatic discharge: human-body, machine, and charged-devices models. The human-body model emulates the action of a human body discharging static electricity, the machine model simulates static discharge from a machine, and the charged-device model simulates the charging and discharging events that occur in production processes and equipment.

Many ESD guns have interchangeable modules containing different discharge Networks or RC Modules (Specific resistance and capacitance values) to simulate different discharges. These modules typically slide into the handle of the pistol portion of the ESD simulator, much like loading some handguns. They change the characteristics of the waveshape discharged from the pistol and are called out in general standards like IEC 61000-4-2, SAE J113 and industry specific standards like ISO 10605. Resistance is referred to in ohms (Ω), capacitance is referred to in picofarad (pF or "puff"). The most commonly used discharge network is for IEC 61000-4-2 and ISO 10605, expressed as 150pF/330Ω. There are over 50 combinations of resistance and capacitance depending on the standards and the applicable electronics.

Test standards
Standards that require ESD testing include:
 ISO 10605
 Ford EMC
 ISO/EN 61000-4-2 needed for the CE mark
IEC 61000-4-2
ISO TR10605
MIL-STD-883
MIL-STD-1512
GR-78-CORE
RTCA/DO 160

References 

Hardware testing
Electronic engineering
Electromagnetic compatibility

de:ESD-Simulationsmodelle